Nathaniel Pearce (14 February 1779 – 12 August 1820) was an explorer who spent many years in Abyssinia (present-day Ethiopia) and wrote a journal of his experiences.

Early life
Pearce was born in East Acton near London, and was educated at private schools, but, proving wild and incorrigible, was apprenticed to a carpenter and joiner in Duke Street, Grosvenor Square. He soon ran away to sea, and on his return was apprenticed to a leather-seller, whom he left suddenly to enlist on the cutter HMS Alert. In May 1794 he was taken prisoner by the French; but after many attempts succeeded in escaping, and served again in the navy.

In Abyssinia
Many adventures followed. After he arrived at Massawa on the Red Sea coast, he accompanied, in the summer of next year, Henry Salt as an English servant on his mission to the court of Ras Wolde Selassie of Tigray.

On Salt's departure in November, Pearce stayed behind in the service of the Ras. On more than one occasion he was compelled by jealous intriguers to quit the court, but by the autumn of 1807 he had made his position there secure. In 1808 he married the daughter of Sidee Paulus, a Greek. In 1810 he met Salt's second expedition, and escorted it from the coast and back. Pearce remained in Abyssinia till 1818, when he set out for Cairo on a visit to Salt. He reached Cairo in 1819, and, after a journey up the Nile, returned there and died in Alexandria from the results of exposure on 12 August 1820.

His journals, which are one long record of adventures, and contain a detailed account of the habits and customs of the Abyssinians, were edited by John James Halls, and published as The Life and Adventures of Nathaniel Pearce (London, 1831).

References

Attribution

 

1779 births
1820 deaths
Explorers of Africa
History of Ethiopia
Converts to Islam